Gustav Meyer (25 November 1850 – 28 August 1900) was a German linguist and Indo-European scholar, considered to be one of the most important Albanologists of his time, most importantly by proving that the Albanian language belongs to the Indo-European family.

Life and works
Meyer was born in Groß Strehlitz in the Prussian Province of Silesia (present-day Strzelce Opolskie in modern Poland). In 1867 he enrolled in the Breslau University (now University of Wrocław) to study classical philology, Indo-European languages, Modern Greek, and Sanskrit. He was there influenced by philologists Martin Hertz and Adolf Friedrich Stenzler. In 1871 he defended his dissertation De nominibus graecis copositus. In the same year he was named assistant professor at the University of Göttingen, and a year later professor of ancient languages in the same university.

He went on to work as a gymnasium teacher in Gotha, from 1874 in Malá Strana, Prague at the intercession of Wilhelm von Hartel, and was appointed outside lecturer (Privatdozent) at the Charles University in 1876. The next year he was named professor of Sanskrit and comparative linguistics at the University of Graz, where he pursued studies of Ancient Greek, Turkish, and Albanian. During this period he published his study Contribution on the theory of word-formation in Greek and Latin (1872).

Full professor at the University of Graz from 1881, Meyer started to focus his studies on albanology, and prepared the foundations of the discipline by publishing the following works:

 Albanesische Studien, I, (1882);
 Etymologisches Wörterbuch der albanesischen Sprache, Strassburg, (1891);
 Kurzgefasste albanesische Grammatik, Leipzig, (1888);
 Zum indogermanischen - Perfectum auf die albanesische Formenlehre, published in the Miscellanea di filologia e linguistica in memoriam by Napoleone Caix e Angelo Canello, Firenze, (1886);
 Die lateinischen Elemente im Albanesischen, published by Gröbers Grundriss, I, I. Auflage (1888) etj.

Meyer is considered to be the linguist that scientifically proved that the Albanian language belongs to the Indo-European family. He is known to have held a long correspondence with Jeronim de Rada, an Albanian leading figure of the Albanian National Awakening.

Gustav Meyer died on August 27, 1900 in Straßgang near Graz. In honour of his contributions to Albanology a grammar school in Tirana, Albania bears his name.

References

External links
 

Albanologists
Linguists from Austria
Austrian philologists
People from Strzelce Opolskie
1850 births
1900 deaths
Academic staff of the University of Göttingen
Academic staff of the University of Graz
University of Breslau alumni
Austro-Hungarian Jews